Matthieu Bataille (born 26 July 1978 in Cucq) is a French judoka.

Achievements

External links

 
 

1978 births
Living people
French male judoka
People from Cucq
Judoka at the 2004 Summer Olympics
Sportspeople from Pas-de-Calais
Mediterranean Games bronze medalists for France
Mediterranean Games medalists in judo
Competitors at the 2001 Mediterranean Games
Olympic judoka of France
21st-century French people